Loggerheads is a village in Denbighshire, Wales on the River Alyn, a tributary of the River Dee.

It is the location of Loggerheads Country Park which follows the course of the River Alyn through karstic limestone countryside including the sites of old lead mines and mills. There is a working flour mill on site.

A leat or leete, built around 1824, follows the side of the valley nearby and was used to carry water to the lead mines of Mold Mines, on land owned by the Grosvenor family. It is now the popular Leete Walk. The name Loggerheads may come from the dispute over estate boundaries between the lordships of Mold and Llanferres. The final boundary is marked by Carreg Carn March Arthur which is said to bear the imprint of Arthur's horse's hoof after it jumped from the nearby mountain, Moel Famau. The local pub has a sign showing two men grimacing at each other with the words We Three Loggerheads, taken from a painting by Richard Wilson. The third loggerhead was the viewer.

Further reading
Gordon Emery, Curious Clwyd 2 (1996) 
Cris Ebbs, Underground Clwyd (1998) 
C J Williams, Lead Mines of the Alyn Valley (1987)

References

External links 

Villages in Denbighshire